Gurunathan Muthuswamy (born 21 July 1963) is an Indian weightlifter. He competed in the men's flyweight event at the 1988 Summer Olympics.

References

1963 births
Living people
Indian male weightlifters
Olympic weightlifters of India
Weightlifters at the 1988 Summer Olympics
Place of birth missing (living people)
Asian Games medalists in weightlifting
Weightlifters at the 1986 Asian Games
Asian Games bronze medalists for India
Medalists at the 1986 Asian Games
20th-century Indian people
21st-century Indian people